The  is a general-purpose Japanese dictionary published by Shogakukan in 1995 and 1998. It was designed as an "all-in-one" dictionary for native speakers of Japanese, especially high school and university students.

History
The  followed upon the success of two other  competitors, Sanseido's  ("Great forest of words", 1988, 1995, 2006) and Kōdansha's color-illustrated  ("Great dictionary of Japanese", 1989, 1995).

The chief editor  was also chief editor of the directly-competing  dictionary. Shogakukan also released a CD-ROM version (1997) of the 1st edition.

The "enlarged and revised" edition  (1998) was more of a revision than an enlargement, with 2978 pages versus 2938 in the 1st edition. Both editions claim "over 220,000 headwords".

Characteristics
The  and  have much more in common than Matsumura's lexicographical supervision and similar ("Great fountain/forest of words") titles. These two dictionaries share many features of design and content. Both arrange word meanings with the most frequent ones first (like the American Heritage Dictionary), in contrast to the  tradition of arranging with the oldest recorded meanings first (like the Oxford English Dictionary). This can be seen in their two respective definitions of the word :

: 
: 

Some similarities between these dictionaries are obvious: Matsumura's 2nd edition  (1995) added some full-color illustrations, including a chart of 168 color names and his  (1995) included a color chart of 358.

Publications

Print editions
1st edition (1995-12-01)
Revised edition (1998-?-?)
2nd edition (2012-11-02): Includes 250,000 entries, Windows DVD-ROM. 2 volumes.

Online search engines
The contents of the  have been used in other dictionary sites, including:
Yahoo!  (Yahoo!)
goo  (goo)
kotobank

The database versions are marked for April, August, December of every year, with updates delivered approximately every 4 months.

Electronic versions
DVD edition: Included with the second edition of the printed book.
Ver.1.00 (2012-11-02)
Ver.2.00 (2013-10-03)
Ver.3.00 (2014-10-08)
Ver.4.00 (2015-11-26)
Downloadable versions: Available for au Smart Pass, Android, iOS, Windows. The database versions and update schedules are same as the search engine versions.

Reviews
The Japanese lexicographer Tom Gally analyzed the :

It also follows 's practice of putting the contemporary meanings first in its definitions. This latter point makes  my first choice when I am writing Japanese and I want to check how words are used in context.

The bibliographer and cataloguer Yasuko Makino also described the :

Over 220,000 words including archaic words, technical terms, geographical and personal names, and other proper names as well although focus is on modern words, are in this easy-to-use dictionary. Numerous examples of usage, explanation of delicate difference in the usage of each words, abundant inclusion of synonyms, and 6,000 all-color illustrations are a few of its strengths. One of the unique features of this dictionary is a listing of last elements, which functions as reverse-order dictionary. Includes detailed color charts. This works as  [Japanese–Japanese dictionary],  [Chinese–Japanese kanji dictionary],  [Classical Japanese dictionary],  [ loanword dictionary], and encyclopedia.

Marketing
A  commercial was listed as an ACC finalist in 2014 54th ACC CM Festival under the interactive division.

References

Bibliography

, review article

External links
 portal 
: Japanese Dictionary (Enlarged and revised edition) Shogakukan's  English homepage
Shogakukan page:  2nd edition

Online dictionaries
goo Gokugojisho 
Kotobank digital  
JapanKnowledge digital  Japanese, English
Yahoo!, Yahoo Japan's free dictionary server searches  and

Dictionary software
Digital  Android, au Smart Pass, iOS, Windows 

1990s books
Japanese dictionaries
Lexicography